Buxton is an unincorporated community in Washington County, Oregon, United States, near Oregon Route 47.

History
The Buxton area was settled by Henry T. Buxton in 1884, and the town was named for his family, including his father, also named Henry Buxton, a pioneer of 1841. A post office was established on December 27, 1886, with Henry T. Buxton as the first postmaster. Buxton was also the name  of a station on the Portland, Astoria & Pacific Railroad above Mendenhall Creek east of the community. A new school building was completed about 1938. In 1954, the community joined with neighboring Manning and Banks to form the Tri-City Rural Fire Protection District (now Banks Fire District). The post office continued until at least 1976 and had a zip code of 97109. The Buxton School, part of the Banks School District, closed in 1998 with the building sold in 2000 to the Banks Christian Academy. Banks Christian Academy closed the Buxton school in June 2015, with the school then being taken over by Faith Bible Christian School.

Climate
This region experiences warm, dry summers, with the average monthly temperature being . According to the Köppen Climate Classification system, Buxton has a warm-summer Mediterranean climate, abbreviated "Csb" on climate maps.

Transportation
Apple Valley Airport
Buxton Trailhead of the Banks–Vernonia State Trail

Points of interest
L. L. "Stub" Stewart Memorial State Park

References

External links

Historic image of Buxton from Salem Public Library
Brochure and map of the Buxton Trailhead

Unincorporated communities in Washington County, Oregon
1886 establishments in Oregon
Populated places established in 1886
Unincorporated communities in Oregon